The men's coxless four competition at the 1956 Summer Olympics took place at Lake Wendouree near Ballarat, Australia.

Results
The following rowers took part:

References

Rowing at the 1956 Summer Olympics